Maria Urban (born 20 December 1941) represented West Germany at the 1976 Summer Olympic Games in archery.

Life 

Urban was born in Bischofshofen, Austria.

She competed in the 1976 Summer Olympic Games in the women's individual event and finished eighth with a score of 2376 points.

References

External links 

 Profile on worldarchery.org

1941 births
Living people
West German female archers
Olympic archers of West Germany
Archers at the 1976 Summer Olympics
People from Bischofshofen